Canaima National Park is a  park in south-eastern Venezuela that roughly occupies the same area as the Gran Sabana region. It is located in Bolívar State, reaching the borders with Brazil and Guyana. The park was named a World Heritage Site by UNESCO.

History
Canaima National Park was established on 12 June 1962.
As early as 1990, the countries that participate in the Amazonian Cooperation Treaty had recommended expanding the Canaima National Park southward to connect it with Monte Roraima National Park in Brazil, with coordinated management of tourism, research and conservation.
In 1994, the Canaima National Park was named a World Heritage Site by UNESCO.

Location

Canaima National Park is the second largest park in Venezuela, after Parima-Tapirapecó, and sixth biggest national park in the world. It is roughly the same size as Belgium or Maryland. The park protects part of the Guayanan Highlands moist forests ecoregion.

About 65% of the park is occupied by plateaus of rock called tepuis, which are a kind of table-top mountain millions of years old, with vertical walls and almost flat tops. These constitute a unique biological environment and are also of great geological interest. Their sheer cliffs and waterfalls including Angel Falls, which is the highest waterfall in the world, at  create spectacular landscapes.

The most famous tepuis in the park are Mount Roraima, the tallest and easiest to climb, and Auyantepui, the site of Angel Falls. The tepuis are sandstone and date back to a time when South America and Africa were part of a super-continent.

The park is home to indigenous Pemon Indians, part of the Carib linguistic group. The Pemon have an intimate relationship with the tepuis, and believe they are the home of the 'Mawari' spirits. The park is relatively remote, with only a few roads connecting towns. Most transport within the park is done by light plane from the airstrips built by various Capuchin missions, or by foot and canoe.

Fauna 

Canaima has a varied fauna, which is distributed throughout the park according to multiple environmental factors such as altitude and vegetation type. Among the species found are:

 Giant armadillo (Priodontes maximus)
 Giant otter (Pteronura brasiliensis)
 Giant anteater (Myrmecophaga tridactyla)
 Cougar (Puma concolor)
 Jaguar (Panthera onca)
 Linnaeus's two-toed sloth (Choloepus didactylus)
 White-faced saki (Pithecia pithecia)
 Brown-backed bearded saki (Chiropotes israelita)
 Roraima mouse (Podoxymys roraimae)
 Tyleria mouse opossum (Marmosa tyleriana)
 Harpy eagle (Harpia harpyja)
 Red-shouldered macaw (Diopsittaca nobilis)
 Dusky parrot (Pionus fuscus)
 Yellow-banded poison dart frog (Dendrobates leucomelas)
 Green iguana (Iguana iguana)
 Hummingbirds (Trochilinae)
 Toucans (Ramphastidae)
 South American bushmaster (Lachesis muta)
 Green acouchi (Myoprocta pratti)
 Bush dog (Speothos venaticus)

Flora 

There are over 300 species endemic only in La Gran Sabana.
 Endemic genera: Achnopogon, Chimantaea, Quelchia, Tepuia, Mallophyton, Adenanthe.
 Abundant insectivorous species from the genera: Brocchinia, Drosera, Heliamphora, Genlisea and Utricularia.

Hydrography 

The park includes the entire watershed of the right bank of the Caroní River and two of the highest waterfalls in the world, the Angel Falls and the Kukenán, as well as plenty of waterfalls of lower altitude.

Land forms 

The only land form are the tepuis, that are plateaus which are unique features, among which are its vertical and nearly flat tops, although there are several tepuies that do not meet these rules. Geologically are remnants of a sedimentary cover composed of very ancient sandstone that is superimposed on a base of igneous rocks (mainly granite) that is even older (nearly 3 billion years). On its summit is home to a substantial amount of specific endemic species, both plant and animal. Some endemic plant species are categorized as "carnivorous", which are thus the food supply (mainly insects) that are so scarce in the mountains. These have a geological formations ranging between 1.5 and 2 billion years, which makes them one of the oldest formations in the world. The best known tepuies are: the Auyantepuy (where it follows the Angel Falls), the Roraima, the Kukenan and the Chimantá among many others.

Tourist attractions

Western Sector

Eastern Sector 
Canaima National Park is spread in south-eastern Venezuela along the border between Guyana and Brazil. The best-known feature of Canaima National Park is its characteristic flat-topped mountain formations known as 'tepuis' which cover roughly 65% of the park. The tepuis constitute a unique biogeological entity and are of great geological interest.

Popular culture 
Canaima is the name given to the fictional Californian coastal town where the movie Arachnophobia is supposed to take place.

Gallery

See also
La Gran Sabana

References

External links 

 Official information about the Canaima National Park
 UNEP World Conservation Monitoring Centre
 Official UNESCO website entry
 Video from Canaima National Park
 Canaima National Park
 Protected Planet Page for Canaima 

 
World Heritage Sites in Venezuela
Guianan savanna
Protected areas established in 1962
Geography of Bolívar (state)
1962 establishments in Venezuela